Joseph Branch, (? - 1864) also referred to as Josephus Branch, was an American lawyer and politician who served as the 1st Florida Attorney General.

History 
Branch is a member of the Branch family, being the nephew of North Carolina Governor John Branch and the brother of Confederate Army Brigadier General Lawrence O'Bryan Branch.

Branch had been a lawyer in the city of Tallahassee in the Florida Territory in the 1830s and 1840s. When Florida received statehood in 1845, Branch was appointed the 1st Florida Attorney General by Governor William Dunn Moseley. He served in this position until July 14, 1846.

Branch was twice married. With his first wife, Annie Pillow Martin, Branch had two children: George Martin and Henry Lewis. With his second wife, Mary Jones Polk, Branch had four children: Mary Polk, Lawrence O'Bryan, Lucia Eugenia, and Joseph Gerald Branch II. The latter would go on to become a member of the Florida Legislature, as well as a successful planter in Desha County, Arkansas until his assassination in 1867 on his plantation. Branch died in 1864.

References

Sources
 

Year of birth missing
Year of death missing
Date of death missing
Place of birth missing
Florida Democrats
Florida Attorneys General
19th-century American lawyers